Turin, New York may refer to:
 Turin (town), New York, located in Lewis County
 Turin (village), New York, located within the Town of Turin

 The Turin, a pre-war luxury apartment building in New York City.